Shuangjing Subdistrict is a subdistrict of Chaoyang District, Beijing, located in the vicinity of Beijing East railway station and the Beijing CBD Its boundaries are the Tonghui River to the North, the East 4th Ring Road to the East, Jinsong High Street to the South, and the boundary between Chaoyang District and Dongcheng District to the West. As of 2020, it has a population of 93,962.

The subdistrict got its name due to the two wells, Tianshui and Kushui wells within the area during the reign of Daoguang Emperor.

History

Administrative Divisions 

As of 2021, there are a total of 18 communities within the subdistrict:

See also 
 List of township-level divisions of Beijing
 Shuangjing Subway Station (Line 10)

References

External links 
 official local government website

Chaoyang District, Beijing
Subdistricts of Beijing